Cécile, is the debut album by American jazz singer Cécile McLorin Salvant. The album was released shortly after she won first prize in the Thelonious Monk International Jazz Competition in 2010 and is composed primarily of both time-tested and unusual jazz standards.

Track listing

Personnel
Adapted from AllMusic.
 Cécile McLorin Salvant – vocals
  - clarinet, tenor saxophone
 Jacques Schneck – piano
 Pierre Maingourd – bass
 Sylvain Glévarec – drums
 Enzo Mucci - guitar

References

2010 debut albums
Cécile McLorin Salvant albums